The Sanitorium Covered Bridge is a bridged located east of Rockville, Indiana. The single-span Burr Arch covered bridge structure was built by Joseph A. Britton in 1913.

It was added to the National Register of Historic Places in 1978.

History
On March 8, 1907 the 65th Indiana General Assembly approved funding to establish and fund a State Tuberculosis Hospital or Sanitorium. By 1908 the State had appropriated land east of Rockville for the use of the State Tuberculosis Hospital. The Sanitorium was soon up and running in 1910.

Originally built on the property of the State Sanitorium, located a mile or so downstream from its current site, for hauling coal to the Sanitorium. The Sanitorium used coal, mined only a couple of miles away near Nyesville, for both heat and for its powerplant. This coal would have been hauled to Rockville and then east across the Plank Road Bridge to the Sanitorium before the bridge being built. The Plank Road Bridge was washed out in the flood of 1913 and was replaced with the Howard Bridge, also built by Britton the same year.

Being on private property after the State sold the Sanitorium the bridge fell into disrepair. On July 30, 2008 the $1.34 million project to move the bridge to the former site of the Adams Covered Bridge was started. The Adams Bridge had been located about a mile upstream and had been built in 1907 by J.P. Van Fossen. In 1969 the bridge was destroyed by a flood where it washed downstream and under the Sanitorium Bridge. During February 3–11, 1970, the Jessup Covered Bridge was moved to replace it. Again in 1989 flood waters would wash this bridge downstream and under the Sanitorium Bridge and over the U.S. 36 bridge. By December 29, 2008 the bridge was open to traffic.

See also
 List of Registered Historic Places in Indiana
 Parke County Covered Bridges
 Parke County Covered Bridge Festival

References

Covered bridges on the National Register of Historic Places in Parke County, Indiana
Bridges completed in 1912
1912 establishments in Indiana
Relocated buildings and structures in Indiana
Wooden bridges in Indiana
Burr Truss bridges in the United States